Pervasive Software was a company that developed  software including database management systems and extract, transform and load tools. Pervasive Data Integrator and Pervasive Data Profiler are integration products, and the Pervasive PSQL relational database management system is its primary data storage product. These embeddable data management products deliver integration between corporate data, third-party applications and custom software.

Pervasive Software was headquartered in Austin, Texas, and sold its products with partners in other countries.
The company is involved in cloud computing through DataSolutions and its DataCloud offering along with its long-standing relationship with salesforce.com.  It was acquired by Actian Corp. in April 2013.

History
Pervasive started in 1982 as SoftCraft developing the database management system technology  Btrieve. Acquired by Novell in 1987, in January 1994 Pervasive spun out as Btrieve Technologies. The company name was changed to Pervasive Software in June 1996. Their initial public offering in 1997 raised $18.6 million.
Ron R. Harris was chief executive and founder Nancy R. Woodward was chairman of the board of directors (the other co-founder was her husband Douglas Woodward). Its shares were listed on the Nasdaq exchange under symbol PVSW.
Its database product  was announced in 1999 as Pervasive.SQL version 7, and later renamed PSQL. PSQL implemented the atomicity, consistency, isolation, durability properties known as ACID using a relational database model.

In August 2003, Pervasive agreed to acquire Data Junction Corporation, makers of data and application integration tools renamed Pervasive Data Integrator, for about $51.7 million in cash and stock shares.  Data Junction, founded in 1984, was a privately held company also headquartered in Austin. The merger closed in December 2003.

Pervasive also acquired business-to-business data interchange service Channelinx in August 2009.  Based in Greenville, South Carolina, it continued operating under the name Pervasive Business Xchange.
In February 2011, Pervasive announced version 5 of DataRush, which included integration with the MapReduce programming model of Apache Hadoop.

In 2013, Pervasive Software was acquired by Actian Corporation for $161.9 million. Actian had initially made offers in August 2012 starting at $154 million 30% higher than its shares traded at the time, and raised its price in November. Pervasive agreed to the deal in January 2013, and it closed in April.

Products
DataRush is a dataflow parallel programming framework in the Java programming language.
DataRush was announced in December 2006 and shipped in 2009.

References

External links
  - company site
  - parent company site

Extract, transform, load tools
Development software companies
Data warehousing products
Software companies based in Texas
Companies based in Austin, Texas
American companies established in 1994
Defunct software companies of the United States